Variable Message Format, abbreviated as "VMF" and documented in MIL-STD-6017, is a communications protocol used in communicating tactical military information. A message formatted using VMF can be sent via many communication methods. As it does not define the method, it is not a Tactical Data Link (TDL).

Restriction
The standard is designated distribution class C, meaning that it may only be distributed to federal employees and contractors. Contractors may obtain a copy from their government POC. However, the standard for the header is openly available.

Format
The VMF application header is defined by MIL-STD-2045-47001. The VMF message body consists of "K" Series messages.

See also

 MIL-STD-6011 (TADIL-A)
 Link 4 (TADIL-C)
 TADIL-J
 JTIDS
 Link 1
 Link 11 - (Link 11B)
 Link 16
 Link 22
 MIDS
 ACARS

External links
 MIL-STD-2045/47001C

References

Military communications
Military installations of NATO
NATO